The Virginia House of Delegates election of 1993 was held on Tuesday, November 2.

Results

Overview 

Source

See also 
 1993 United States elections
 1993 Virginia elections
 1993 Virginia gubernatorial election
 1993 Virginia lieutenant gubernatorial election
 1993 Virginia Attorney General election

References 

House of Delegates
Virginia
Virginia House of Delegates elections